Ivan Wayne Stevens (born 17 May 1988) is a South African former rugby union footballer, who played professional rugby between 2009 and 2015.

Career

He made his full debut for the team in the 2009 Vodacom Cup and also represented the Shimlas in the Varsity Cup competition.

He was named captain of a South African Barbarians (South) team to face England during the 2012 mid-year rugby test series. He was initially named in the  squad for the 2013 Super Rugby season, but was later released to the 2013 Vodacom Cup squad.

He joined  for the 2014 season.

He retired after the 2015 Vodacom Cup tournament to pursue a career as a financial advisor in Polokwane.

References

South African rugby union players
Eastern Province Elephants players
South African people of British descent
Living people
1988 births
Rugby union centres
Rugby union players from Bloemfontein